Planodema namibiensis is a species of beetle in the family Cerambycidae. It was described by Adlbauer in 1998. It is known from Namibia.

References

Endemic fauna of Namibia
Theocridini
Beetles described in 1998